The BBC One "Circle" idents were a set of on-screen channel identities used on BBC One from 7 October 2006 to 4 December 2016. They also featured on the BBC Studios channel, BBC America. The idents contained images of circles being formed by nature, or people and their actions. This was the longest set of idents that was used by BBC One, as they lasted for 10 years.

Launch
The Circles ident package was announced on 26 September 2006 as the replacement for the "Rhythm & Movement" idents that had been in use since Easter 2002. When BBC One channel controller changed to Peter Fincham, he hinted in August 2005 that the dancers would be changed soon. He announced at the Edinburgh International Television Festival that "It may well be that the time is coming to look at a new way of doing it. No date or direct decision has been made but it's under review".

The new idents would come into force alongside a revised schedule for the channel. The idents themselves were designed and produced for the BBC by Red Bee Media and marking the end of Lambie-Nairn's time at the BBC after fifteen years. Imran Hanif composed the original music for all idents, having been selected from a shortlist of 12 composers and bands.

Components of look
All the idents revolved around a circular theme and all featured a scene which is revealed to end in a circle formation. The circle symbol was decided upon as a "symbol of unity", but it was also a "nod" towards the channel's heritage and in particular, the classic globe icon used in various styles for much of its history. The idents would involve people, plants or animals moving, or whose interaction causes a circular shape, which is revealed at the end of the ident. The circle would then be emphasised by white lines and a red eclipse animating around it and revealing the BBC One logo at the end. The new BBC One logo featured a large lower case "one" in the centre of the circle, with a smaller BBC logo to the upper left of the "one". The channel uses this logo on its idents and promotions, however uses a box logo, similar to the last look, for promotions where the BBC One logo appears alongside other channels. This boxed logo features the BBC logo above the lower case "one" in a red box. The box closely relates to the logos of BBC Two and BBC Four.

As with the previous look, no clock ident was used, a trend repeated across nearly all other channels in the UK, however the "Generic", "Helicopter", "Capes" and "Kites" idents may also be used for introduction into the news, following criticisms in the previous look that the dancers didn't have an ident suitable for this purpose.

Promotion style featured the BBC One logo appear at the bottom of the screen, similar to the 1997 look,  before switching to the centre of a shaded red end-board, with the logo appearing in the centre. Static slides, now very much a rarely seen occurrence, featured the image as a cut out eclipse in the right hand side of the screen.

In July 2008, the "Kites", "Moon", and "Windows" idents were dropped, but the "Kites" ident was reinstated on 2 May 2009.

On 2 May 2009, all the idents were made shorter with new adaptations of the original Imran Hanif music, with the exception of "Generic", "Hippos" and "Surfers". The May 2009 idents were composed by David Arnold.

Idents

Special idents 
In addition to the usual set of idents used throughout the year, numerous other idents have been added for special occasions, both nationally and in the nations and regions. Some of these are included below.

Christmas

Other
Daffodils – 1 March 2007 – 2012, 2013–2016 – A special Saint David's Day ident used on BBC One Wales only. This ident used the "Moon" ident music from 2007 to 2009; from 2010 onwards this was replaced by the edited "Roses" ident music.
BBC Won Wales 2008 – February 2008 – Ident seen on BBC One Wales to celebrate Wales' win over England in the 2008 Six Nations Championship. This ident uses the "Bike" ident music and reads "BBC Won" instead of "BBC One".
Robert Burns – 25 January 2009 – Shown to commemorate the 250th anniversary of the birth of Robert Burns, this ident features two mice circling on an untidy heap of manuscripts, in reference to a poem by Burns, To a Mouse. Seen on BBC One Scotland only.
Ashes to Ashes – April to July 2009 & 2010 – Used to promote the second and third series of Ashes to Ashes, it featured the characters of the programme seated in an Audi Quattro set in 1982. It premiered on 11 April 2009 and was directed by Tim Pope and conceived by James Spence and Joe Lee.
Glitterballs – November to December 2009 – Ident promoting and shown directly before Strictly Come Dancing. In this ident, the circle is centred around a glitter ball and uses a variation of the show's theme music as the ident's background music. First shown on 7 November and not seen after 12 December 2009. A new version, with gold glitterballs instead of the original silver, debuted on 23 September 2016 with the same music.
EastEnders – February to September 2010 – Also known as Albert Square. This ident promoting EastEnders 25th anniversary, it features the regular cast members looking in amazement as the Albert Square turns into Albert Circle. Written and Directed by James Spence, it was first aired on Monday 15 February on the 25th Anniversary week, and continued to air at the start of most of the programmes to celebrate the 25th Anniversary year. This ident was last aired on 10 September following set changes as part of a story arc, namely the fire at the Queen Vic pub. The ident was reintroduced in 2015 to be shown before every episode of EastEnders, albeit a shorter version, as many of the characters featured in the original no longer appear in the show.House of Fun – Ident promoting the new Saturday night schedule consisting of Over the Rainbow, Doctor Who and Total Wipeout. Features cartoon versions of Graham Norton, Charlotte Church, the Eleventh Doctor and Richard Hammond representing each programme respectively. Created by Aardman Animations, it was used on Saturday Nights from 24 April to 19 June 2010.Planet Dinosaur – Ident promoting the new dinosaur documentary series Planet Dinosaur. The ident uses an edited clip from the programme; a Camptosaurus is seen eating plants whilst the camera moves to reveal an Allosaurus, whose zoomed in eye is where the logo forms. It was used between 14 September 2011 and 19 October 2011, which was the series' run.Wild Week – An ident used on the Wild Week season on BBC One Northern Ireland. The ident focuses on a duck and uses the Forest ident music.Frozen Planet – An ident used to introduce and promote the Frozen Planet documentary series. A group of penguins are seen. The logo forms around the sun. It was used between 26 October 2011 and 28 December 2011, which was the series' run.Planet Earth Live – An ident used to introduce and promote Planet Earth Live. Similar to Frozen Planet, the earth is seen, before the camera zooms in, to reveal a desert with birds and elephants.St David's Day 2012 – Shadows of people walking towards the sunset are shown. Only seen 1 March 2012 on BBC One Wales. The soundtrack is the original unedited music from Forest.Love 2013 – The BBC One logo gives way to a rippling background upon which is written 'LOVE 2013'. A variation was also made for spring entitled Love Spring.Africa – The BBC One logo appears on top of an African night sky, and separately on a flock of flamingoes. BBC Won Wales 2013 – An aerial view camera zooms in onto the Millennium Stadium. A rugby ball can be seen flying out of the stadium, leaving behind it a trail of smoke. The camera pans around 180 degrees and after a firework explodes, "BBC Won Wales" appears. March 2013. BBC Onesie – A bunch of people dressed up in onesies walk up some curved stairs. "BBC Onesie" appears. Used to link in Comic Relief 2013 back from BBC Two after the 10 'O Clock news.The Voice UK – Special ident to introduce the second series of the talent competition, The Voice UK, in 2013. The four coaches (Danny O'Donoghue, Jessie J, Tom Jones and will.i.am) are seen in their revolving chairs before the camera rests on the view of the stage from behind the microphone.Love 2014 – Similar to the Love 2013 ident, but with a different soundtrack. The BBC One logo gives way to a rippling background with the words 'LOVE 2014' written inside a heart shape. First used at 00:30 on New Year's Day 2014.Torchwood: Children of Earth – It begins with many different idents, but while it zooms back, it eventually lost its signal (like the TV would do), which was replaced with things from Torchwood series in glitches.Commonwealth Games 2014 – Panoramic views of some of the venues of the 2014 Commonwealth Games in Glasgow are seen before the camera rests on the roof of the SSE Hydro where the BBC One logo forms. The music from the "Capes" ident is used. Introduced the channel's coverage of the Games from 23 July to 3 August. Scotland continues to use this ident until 4 December 2016.Life Story – This special ident is used from 23 October to 27 November 2014 features the male pufferfish creates an amazing display of circles to attract females where the BBC One logo forms. It was used to promote the coverage of the epic six-part Nature documentary, Life Story narrated by David Attenborough.Enjoy 2015 – Various items and themes related to the month of January, such as high street store sales and a fireplace are shown before the BBC One logo appears on a plain red background, with a mug of cocoa in the "O" of the logo. Another ident showing the two people riding at the ice skaters and the gloves showing the two are shown before the BBC One logo appears on a plain red background, with birds eating a suet ball that forms the "O" of the logo. First seen at 00:30 on New Year's Day 2015 and was last used airing into BBC News on 1 February 2015.Rio 2016 – In this ident, an anteater is swinging a wooden hammer in the Amazon rainforest. This ident was used for the 2016 Summer Olympics in Rio. First seen on 5 August 2016 and it was last seen on 21 August 2016.Planet Earth II''' – These three idents are introduced to promote the six-part nature documentary Planet Earth II, in the first ident, mountains are staying still and it changes the sky from daytime to night-time during the Time-lapse (with clouds drifting away and turns into stars at night), in the second ident, two Nubian ibexes are walking steadily across the steep of rocky mountains, female ibex is supported by a young male ibex to follow the tracks as the camera zooms slowly to see some Nubian ibexes walking the rocks, and the final one, a band of flamingoes strides quickly towards the single flamingo in the water, albeit with an audio is the same as "Glitterballs", but more joyous than the other two idents. First aired on 6 November 2016 and it was last aired on 4 December 2016.

In addition to the idents above, some modifications were made to existing idents to promote other programmes. A chameleon, which caught and ate a fairy, was added to the Forest ident to promote Life in Cold Blood in February 2008; and to promote the BBC One Wales series Rolf Harris on Welsh Art, the Forest ident was again modified to have a paint like appearance. In addition to this, red noses were added to some of the hippos in the Hippos ident for Comic Relief programmes in 2007 and 2009, and an animated Pudsey Bear was added to the Ring-a-Roses ident for the BBC Children In Need appeal for 2010. A modified version of Mission Control was made for the Doctor Who episode The Bells of Saint John with the end of the ident appearing as if it had been hacked into by the Great Intelligence, and the TARDIS was also seen used floating underwater in the Hippos'' ident. In preparation for the 50th Anniversary special of Doctor Who, The Day of the Doctor, various idents throughout November have featured a rewind effect, with the Eleventh Doctor intruding and informing the viewer that "the clock is ticking". A similar modification was made in August 2014, to promote, and which featured, the first episode to involve the Twelfth Doctor.

BBC America
All of the idents were also used on BBC America, the BBC's outlet in the United States. The BBC America versions of the idents featured the words "One World" in the same font and position as the "One" in the BBC One logo before animating itself into the current stacked BBC America logo. These idents were cut down compared to the original British versions, however they retained their original soundtrack when the British versions were changed in May 2009.

Replacement
After a little over 10 years in use, the "Circle" idents ceased at the end of 2016, with their final appearance on 4 December 2016, although some were used in January 2017.

The presentation was replaced by the 'Oneness' idents, created by Martin Parr, essentially continuing on from the theme of the Christmas idents from 2016; as such, the Christmas idents that year could have been seen as a preview to the full new look that was revealed in the night on New Year's Day 2017.

See also

 History of BBC television idents

References

External links 
 bbc.co.uk - BBC One Website
 BBC One "Circle" idents on TVARK

BBC One
BBC Idents
Television presentation in the United Kingdom